Randhawa is a Jat clan in  the Punjab Region of India and Pakistan. The Randhawa name has special significance in the history of the Sikh faith, the first appointed Granthi (Principal religious official and custodian of the holy book- Guru Granth Sahib) was a Randhawa (Baba Buddha)

Notable people who bear the name and may or may not be associated with the clan are:
Arfa Abdul Karim Randhawa (1995–2012), Pakistani child prodigy, youngest Microsoft Certified Professional
Iftikhar  Randhawa, Pakistani politician and writer
Afzal Ahsan Randhawa, Pakistani writer, member of National Assembly of Pakistan
Baba Buddha Ji Randhawa, prime historical figure in Sikhism
Dara Singh Randhawa, Indian wrestler and actor
Gurbachan Singh Randhawa, Indian athlete
Guriq Randhawa, English cricketer
Guru Randhawa, Indian singer and songwriter from Gurdaspur, Punjab, India
Gurman Randhawa, English cricketer
Jesse Randhawa, Indian actress and model
Jyoti Randhawa, Indian golfer
Karishma Randhawa, Indian actress
Kuljeet Randhawa, Indian actress and model
Kulraj Randhawa, Indian actress
Mahabali Shera (born Amanpreet Singh Randhawa), Indian wrestler
Mohinder Singh Randhawa, Indian administrator, historian and botanist
Muhammad Tahir Randhawa, Pakistani politician
Nikki Haley, née Randhawa, United States Ambassador to the United Nations
Ravinder Randhawa, British writer
Saadhika Randhawa, Indian actor
Sardara Singh Randhawa, Indian wrestler and actor
Shaad Randhawa, Indian actor
Sukhjinder Singh Randhawa, Indian politician
Surjit Singh Randhawa, Indian field hockey player
Ripudaman Randhawa, Canadian Artist

References 

Surnames
Punjabi tribes
Jat clans
Punjabi-language surnames